Meta Mačus (born 25 March 1975) is a Slovenian sprinter. She competed in the women's 4 × 400 metres relay at the 2000 Summer Olympics.

References

1975 births
Living people
Athletes (track and field) at the 2000 Summer Olympics
Slovenian female sprinters
Olympic athletes of Slovenia
Place of birth missing (living people)
Mediterranean Games bronze medalists for Slovenia
Mediterranean Games medalists in athletics
Athletes (track and field) at the 2001 Mediterranean Games
Olympic female sprinters